Eragrostis condensata is a species of grass that is endemic to Ecuador.

References

condensata
Endemic flora of Ecuador
Least concern plants
Taxonomy articles created by Polbot